CMT may refer to:

Television
 Canal Maximo Televisión, a defunct Venezuelan regional network
 Castilla–La Mancha TV, a Spanish regional channel
 CMT (American TV channel)
 CMT (Canadian TV channel)
 CMT (Australian TV channel)

Science and technology
 Cadmium mercury telluride
 Cold Metal Transfer, a welding technique

Computing
 Clustered multi-thread, AMD CPU technology 
 Chip-level multithreading, a Sun Microsystems technique
 Composable Memory Transactions
 Container managed transactions in Enterprise JavaBeans

Medicine
 California mastitis test
 Charcot–Marie–Tooth disease of the peripheral nervous system
 Chemically modified tetracyclines, a type of tetracycline antibiotics
 Certified massage therapist
 Combat medical technician

Organizations
 Confédération Mondiale du Travail (World Confederation of Labour)
 Transitional Military Council (Chad)

Education and training
 Connecticut Mastery Test, a school test
 Compulsory military training in New Zealand
 Chartered Market Technician, a term used by the CMT Association of technical analysts

Other uses
 Carrier Mortar Tracked, an Indian self-propelled mortar
 Culturally modified tree, a tree modified as part of tradition